Deerness (Old Norse: Dyrnes) is a quoad sacra parish (i.e. one created and functioning for ecclesiastical purposes only) and peninsula in Mainland, Orkney, Scotland. Deerness forms a part of the civil parish of St. Andrews and Deerness. There is a shop/post office and a community centre and the Deerness Distillery.

Deerness is connected to the rest of the Orkney Mainland by a narrow isthmus, known as Dingieshowe. Deerness parish consists chiefly of the peninsula, but also takes in its surrounding islets of Copinsay, the Horse of Copinsay and Corn Holm. The Brough of Deerness is the site of an early Christian monastery near the north eastern tip of the peninsula.

The Crown of London shipwreck
The Covenanter's Memorial at Deerness, commemorating the loss in a shipwreck of 200 Covenanters en route to the New World of America (as a punishment), was largely paid for by Robert Halliday Gunning.  The inscription on the monument reads "For Christ His Crown Covenant, erected by public subscription Aug. 1888 to the memory of the 200 covenanters who were taken prisoners at Bothwell Bridge, and sentence to transportation for life; but who perished by shipwreck near this spot on 10th December 1679." 

John Blackadder recorded that a prisoner related the following:

Notable people
Edwin Muir was born in Deerness in 1887.

References
Citations

Sources

Parishes of Orkney
Orkneyinga saga places
Mainland, Orkney
Persecution of the Covenanters